Jean-Jacques Lozach (born 8 February 1954) is a French politician who has represented the Creuse department in the Senate since 2008. A member of the Socialist Party, he presided over the General Council of Creuse from 2001 to 2015. Lozach previously served as Mayor of Masbaraud-Mérignat from 1986 to 1995 and Mayor of Bourganeuf from 1995 to 2001.

Lozach has served as the councillor of Creuse for the canton of Bourganeuf since 1994. He also served as a regional councillor of Limousin from 1998 to 2008, holding one of the regional council's vice presidencies during his tenure.

References
  Page on the Senate website

1954 births
Living people
Socialist Party (France) politicians
French people of Breton descent
French Senators of the Fifth Republic
Senators of Creuse
People from Creuse
Politicians from Nouvelle-Aquitaine
Mayors of places in Nouvelle-Aquitaine
Departmental councillors (France)
Presidents of French departments
Regional councillors of France